Parasite is a science fiction novel written by Mira Grant (the pseudonym of American author Seanan McGuire). It was released on October 29, 2013, by Orbit Books and is the first volume of the Parasitology trilogy. The other two books in the series are Symbiont (November 25, 2014) and Chimera (November 24, 2015).

The book, in the tradition of fictional parasites, envisages a world where people's immune systems are maintained by genetically engineered tapeworms.

References

External links
 NPR Books Review

Novels by Seanan McGuire
2013 American novels
Fiction about parasites
Novels about genetic engineering
2013 science fiction novels
Orbit Books books
Eucestoda